Harshad is a given name. Notable people with the given name include:

Harshad Arora (born 1987), Indian television actor
Harshad Chopda (born 1983), Indian actor 
Harshad Joshi, Indian television show director
Harshad Meher (born 1992), Indian footballer
Harshad Mehta (1954–2001), Indian stockbroker

See also
 Harshad number, integer sequence